The Desolate One is the third album by golden age/hardcore hip hop emcee Just-Ice, released in 1989 and produced by KRS-One (see 1989 in music). In 1996, it was played in part on KROQ by Bradley Nowell of Sublime. Nowell claimed it to be one of his favorite albums.

Track listing
 All lyrics composed by Just-Ice. All music composed by KRS-One.
"The Desolate One"
"...And Justice For All"
"Hardhead"
"Welfare Recipients"
"Na Touch Da Just"
"It's Time I Release"
"In The Jungle"
"Hijack"
"Ram Dance Hall Session"

Personnel
 Heavy D. - additional vocals on "Ram Dance Hall Session"
 Ivan "DJ Doc" Rodriguez - recording engineer, co-producer
 D-Nice - co-producer
 KRS-One - mixing
 Howie Weinberg: mastering
 Janette Beckman: photography
 Icon Design: art direction

Charts

Weekly charts

Year-end charts

References

1989 albums
Just-Ice albums
Fresh Records (US) albums